Li Hua is  Chinese artist.

Li Hua may also refer to:

Li Hua (volleyball)
Dragon Li, cat breed
Li Hua (artist, born 1980)